Ellis Lewis (May 16, 1798March 19, 1871) was a Pennsylvania lawyer and judge.  He served on the state's Supreme Court for six years, the last three as chief justice.

Life and career

Ellis Lewis was the youngest child of Major Eli and Pamela Lewis.  Orphaned at the age of nine, he was apprenticed as a printer to the owner of the Harrisburg newspaper founded by his father.  After five years, he ran away and found work as a printer under an assumed name.  By 1818, he owned a newspaper in Williamsport, Lycoming County.  There he studied law with Espy Van Horne.  He sold the newspaper in 1821, and was admitted to the bar in 1822.  He continued to work with his brothers Eli and James and their newspapers, by which means he began his involvement in Pennsylvania politics.

Lewis married Josephine Wallis in 1822.  Their oldest child, Juliet would become a poet and novelist, and marry James Hepburn Campbell, a lawyer and politician.

In 1823, Lewis supported John Andrew Shulze's election as Governor of Pennsylvania, and was appointed in 1824 Deputy Attorney General for Lycoming and Tioga Counties.  That year a painful condition developed in his leg, and as of 1827, he was reappointed for Lycoming County only.  In 1827, surgery removed a necrosis from his tibia.  While recovering, he resigned his position. and moved to Towanda, Bradford County.

In 1832, Lewis was elected to the Pennsylvania House, as an Independent.  Early in 1833, he was appointed state Attorney General, without giving up his House seat.  He resigned both positions when, late in 1833, he was appointed President Judge of the Eighth Judicial District.  In 1843 he was appointed President Judge of the Second Judicial District.

In 1850, Pennsylvania amended its constitution to choose its Supreme Court members by election.  Lewis was elected in 1851, and became chief justice in 1854.  At the end of his term in 1857, he declined to run for re-election and retired, making his home in Philadelphia.  He took up poetry (like his father and daughter) and also wrote on law.  He died in 1871, and was buried at The Woodlands.

Notes

References

Further reading

External links
 

1798 births
1871 deaths
Editors of Pennsylvania newspapers
Pennsylvania Attorneys General
Pennsylvania lawyers
Justices of the Supreme Court of Pennsylvania
Burials at The Woodlands Cemetery
19th-century American judges
19th-century American lawyers